Brisby is a surname. Notable people with the surname include:

Liliana Brisby (1923–1998), Bulgarian-born British broadcaster, writer, editor, and concert pianist
Vincent Brisby (born 1971), American football player

See also
Risby (disambiguation)